Delta Glacier is a glacier descending steeply from the Worcester Range between Northcliffe Peak and Delta Bluff to enter the west side of Skelton Glacier. It was provisionally named "Cascade Glacier", because of its broken lower icefalls, by the New Zealand party of the Commonwealth Trans-Antarctic Expedition, 1956–58. As this name is a duplication, they renamed the glacier after nearby Delta Bluff.

References

Glaciers of Hillary Coast